Billy Ballew Motorsports was a team that competed in the NASCAR Camping World Truck Series. They were formed in 1996 by Georgia businessman Billy Ballew.

Fasscore Motorsports 
In 2003, Ballew began running a second truck under the name Fasscore Motorsports with Christopher Beckington as the owner. Rich Bickle finished eighth in its first race, followed by Andy Houston the next race. After Lance Hooper started their next event, Kenny Hendrick drove for the rest of the season, providing a best finish of 31st. The team disbanded at the end of the season.

Truck No. 15 history

The 15 truck of Billy Ballew Motorsports had been its original truck since the 1996 season. Originally based in Georgia, the team debuted at Bristol Motor Speedway with Mark Gibson driving the Ford F-150 with sponsorship from Isaac Leasco. In their first race, Ballew Motorsports finished 12th, and followed it up with a ninth-place run at their next race at The Milwaukee Mile. After running the next five races with L.C. Smith Sales sponsorship, Gibson stepped out of the ride and was replaced by Bobby Gill. Gill brought Nashville Auto Auction sponsorship, and had two eleventh-place runs before Rick Johnson finished out the season. His best finish was a fifteenth at Phoenix International Raceway. In 1997, Mike Cope was hired to run a limited schedule with Penrose Meat Snacks sponsorship. They ran six races that year, with a best finish of 12th coming at Louisville.

After taking nearly a year off, the team returned at Milwaukee in 1998. Scott Hansen qualified the Oshkosh Trucks/Neihus entry eighth but finished twenty-fourth. Bickle would then drive in two races later that season with Turbine Solutions sponsorship, finishing in the top-five in both races. The team's first start in 1999 came at Martinsville, where Joe Ruttman finished thirteenth in the Ortho truck. Their next start came late in the season at Las Vegas Motor Speedway when Cope returned and finished thirtieth with sponsorship from Manheim Auctions.

The team gained notoriety in 2000 when their truck, sponsored by Line-X and driven by former Daytona 500 winner Geoffrey Bodine was involved in a fiery crash in the tri-oval at Daytona International Speedway. Bodine survived, and for the next three weeks, his son Barry drove the truck, and had two top-twenty finishes. Bobby Gill then returned for two races, but he did not finish higher than 32nd. At Chicago Motor Speedway, the briefly switched to the No. 32 to accommodate Anthony Lazzaro, who finished 22nd in the race. For 2001, the team had originally with African-American driver Preston Tutt, but the deal fell through. Their first race of the year came at Martinsville Speedway, Jon Wood made his first start in the Mark Warner-sponsored truck, and finished 31st. Derek Gilcrist then drove at Darlington Raceway, and finished seventeenth, followed later by Rick Beebe finishing 30th at Kansas Speedway in the Trailside RV entry.

Ballew's No. 15 changed its name to Countryman-Ballew Motorsports, the team improved its standings from 23rd to 14th would run full-time in 2002 with driver Trent Owens and jeans manufacturer Dickies sponsoring the truck. After Owens attempted seven races, he was replaced by Rich Bickle, who had a sixth-place run in his first race. Before the Power Stroke Diesel 200, Dickies had signed a deal to sponsor Bobby Hamilton Racing's No. 18 truck and driver Robert Pressley for the remainder of 2002 and all of 2003, causing the team to go without major sponsorship. Mark Gibson returned for two races, followed by Brian Rose before Andy Houston finished out the year.

Houston was signed for 2003 with Vokal Clothing sponsoring. Houston had a top-five finish at Daytona, but was released after five races, and Bickle returned with a top-ten finish. Mike Skinner then drove for four races as the team switched to Dodge for various races. After separate three-race runs by Ryan Hemphill and Robby Benton, Bickle returned to run Fords and had two twelfth-place runs. In 2004, Ballew switched to Chevrolet and hired Shane Hmiel to drive the truck full-time, with sponsorship from Small's Harley-Davison, Whittaker Farms, and later Trim Spa. Hmiel would bring Ballew his first Truck Series win at the Las Vegas 350, passing Todd Bodine late in the race. Hmiel moved to the Busch Series in 2005, and Kerry Earnhardt was originally hired to drive the 15, and won the pole for the season-opening race in the Kraft Foods truck, but was replaced after two races for Hmiel. Kyle Busch and ditech then took the truck, and won his first two races in the ride. Blake Feese, Martin Truex Jr., Kenny Wallace, Johnny Sauter, and David Gilliland ran one-race deals for the team, and John Andretti had two top-tens in four races. Busch finished out the season, and added another win at Atlanta.

In 2006, Ballew signed on ARCA RE/MAX Series driver Kyle Krisiloff, with sponsorship from ditech. However, after conflicts with Kyle's father Steve, a famous USAC driver, Ballew would release Krisiloff and again field multiple drivers. The rotation included recently reinstated driver Kevin Grubb, Andretti, Mike Wallace, and Busch returned to the team. The best finish came for Busch, who finished second at Texas. For 2007, African-American driver Bill Lester was tapped to drive the No. 15 truck. However, with ongoing sponsorship difficulties midway through the season, Lester stepped out of the truck, handing it over to drivers Denny Hamlin, Andrew Myers, J. R. Norris and Shane Sieg. Rookie Marc Mitchell was signed to compete for Rookie of the Year in the 15 with Hyprene Ergon sponsoring for 21 races in 2008. He drove thirteen before being replaced by a variety of drivers, including Hamlin, David Stremme, Ryan Lawler, Kenny Wallace, John Andretti, James Buescher, and Jason White. For 2009, Sieg, Ickler, Aric Almirola, and Blake Feese shared the No. 15. Ted Musgrave, Steve Wallace, Johnny Benson Jr., Nelson Piquet Jr., and Johanna Long shared the 15 in 2010.

Vision Aviation Racing

In 2011, Ballew merged his organization with K&N West Series team Vision Aviation Racing. Their drivers Dusty Davis and Justin Johnson ran for Rookie of the Year. However, since neither driver was approved to run at Daytona International Speedway, two-time Daytona 500 winner Michael Waltrip drove the No. 15 at Daytona in the 2011 NextEra Energy Resources 250 with sponsorship from the Wounded Warrior Project and NASCAR.com RaceView. Waltrip would later win the race, on the 10th anniversary of his first Cup Series win as well as the 10th anniversary of the death of Dale Earnhardt in the 2001 Daytona 500. Just seconds after winning, a broken rear spoiler was discovered on his truck. Despite the infraction, Waltrip kept the emotional victory and his truck builder was fined $15,000 and put on probation for the broken piece.  The team fielded West Series driver Dusty Davis for only three races before shutting down temporarily. VAR fielded  Formula One World Champion Kimi Räikkönen in his NASCAR debut at Charlotte Motor Speedway. The team then shut down and laid off many of its employees. The No. 15 was used by Kyle Busch Motorsports as a second entry for other drivers. Engine builder Joey Arrington bought VAR's remaining equipment and fielded trucks for David Starr and Dusty Davis.

Truck No. 51 history
The 51 truck made its debut at Lowe's Motor Speedway in 2006 with Kyle Busch driving. The use of the number and the name "Rowdy Busch" over the door were a tribute to Rowdy Burns in the film Days of Thunder. With sponsorship from National Land Liquidations, Busch won his first race in the truck, and finished eighth in his next race in the truck at Dover. Johnny Sauter and Martin Truex Jr. also ran one race apiece in the 51. In 2007, Busch ran a majority of the races with the Flanders Beef Patties truck, and winning twice. Kenny Wallace, Aric Almirola, and Paul Menard each ran one race in the truck, with Kelly Sutton driving in four races with Copaxone sponsorship.

In 2008, Busch and Shane Sieg shared driving duties in the 51, running Toyota Tundras with NOS Energy Drink, Miccosukee Indian Resort & Gaming, and San Bernardino County as sponsors. Busch drove the No. 51 part-time in 2009 with NOS and Miccosukee returning as sponsors, and Brian Ickler drove the races when Busch did not. After 2009, Busch formed his own team, Kyle Busch Motorsports, and signed Ickler as a driver. Aric Almirola ran the full 2010 season with Graceway Pharmaceuticals sponsoring. Almirola took two wins and scored 21 top-tens en route to finishing 2nd in points to Todd Bodine. Almirola left the team to drive JR Motorsports' No. 88 Chevrolet. Almirola drove for VAR at Daytona, though the No. 51 was intended to be driven by VAR development driver Justin Johnson. Financial problems forced Vision Aviation owners to shut down the Truck team. Chris Fontaine drove the truck at Dover. The team was bought out by Ballew once more and fielded a Ford for Colin Braun in 2 races. Kyle Busch Motorsports ran the 51 for various drivers, including Josh Richards and German Quiroga for a few races in 2011.

On August 31, 2012, Billy Ballew Motorsports returned to truck competition by fielding the No. 51 Chevy for Sprint Cup Series driver Kurt Busch in the Jeff Foxworthy's Grit Chips 200 at Atlanta Motor Speedway. This was the team's first race in 2012, after shutting its doors at the end of the 2011 season. Busch qualified the truck in 19th out of 36th place and finished in 10th. The truck used for this race was chassis number 11, which enjoyed a long history of wins for the team (12 total). That truck was fielded with support from Phoenix Racing.

References

External links 
Billy Ballew Motorsports
Team Website

1996 establishments in the United States
American auto racing teams
Companies based in North Carolina
Defunct NASCAR teams